Mr. Rockefeller may refer to:

 John D. Rockefeller, American oil magnate
 Mr. Rockefeller, a 1976 Bette Midler song from the Songs for the New Depression